Aleksandra Billewicz (Oleńka, Aleksandra Billewiczówna, later Kmicicowa)  is a fictional character created by Henryk Sienkiewicz, appearing in the novel  The Deluge as the main female protagonist. She is a wise Lithuanian noblewoman, by the will of her grandfather engaged to Andrzej Kmicic.

In 1974 film she is portrayed by Małgorzata Braunek.

Description 
Panna Aleksandra raised her head, as if roused by the silence which followed the exclamations of the man; then the blaze lighted up her face and her serious blue eyes looking from beneath black brows. She was a comely lady, with flaxen hair, pale complexion, and delicate features. She had the beauty of a white flower. The mourning robes added to her dignity. Sitting before the chimney, she seemed buried in thought, as in a dream; doubtless she was meditating over her own lot, for her fates were in the balance.

References 

Sienkiewicz's Trilogy
Fictional Polish people
Literary characters introduced in 1884
Characters in novels of the 19th century